Amelia E. Johnson (Amelia Etta Hall Johnson, 1858–1922) was a Canadian writer and poet.

Early life and career 
Johnson was born in Toronto, Ontario, Canada. As an editor she sought to encourage other writers with African American ancestry by publishing their works in a short periodical. Writing under the name Mrs. A. E. Johnson, her approach to fiction has been compared to Emma Dunham Kelley and Paul Laurence Dunbar, focusing on the social circumstances of her characters rather than identifying ethnic or "racial" aspects. 

The study of her works by literary critics after a century of obscurity renewed interest in Johnson, though she had been praised by her contemporaries. Johnson's works include children's literature, Sunday school fiction, and three novels: Clarence and Corinne, which was the first Black-authored work to be published by the American Baptist Publication Society of Philadelphia, The Hazeley Family (1894), and Martina Meriden (2020)

Personal life 
She was married to a well-known Baptist minister, the Rev. Harvey Johnson, whom she met after moving to Boston in the United States. She also published in many well-known Black print venues, such as The Baptist Messenger, The American Baptist, and Our Women and Children.

She is also the English translator of "Sleeping Beauty" by Charles Perrault (Dodd Mead and Company, 1921)

In 1887, she published The Joy and, in 1888, she published The Ivy. These short-lived magazines targeted young African Americans and educated them about their culture, The Joy targeting young girls with stories and The Ivy spreading awareness of African American history.

References

External links 

 

1858 births
1922 deaths
American women novelists
American women poets
American women short story writers
Writers from Toronto
19th-century American novelists
19th-century American short story writers
19th-century American women writers
20th-century American novelists
20th-century American short story writers
20th-century American women writers
19th-century Canadian women writers
19th-century Canadian writers
20th-century Canadian women writers
20th-century Canadian writers